William Arthur Deacon (4 February 1872 – 25 December 1943) was a farmer and member of the Queensland Legislative Assembly.

Biography
Deacon was born at Allora, Queensland, to parents William Deacon and his wife Ann Amelia (née Bray) and educated at the Allora State School. He became a farmer and in 1910 took over his father's farm in Allora. He also liked to breed Clydesdale horses and grow grapes.

7 Jun 1922, Deacon married Ada Florence Dougall (died 1977) and together had one son and one daughter. He died at his Allora home in 1943 and was buried in the Allora Cemetery.

Political career
Replacing the retiring Francis Grayson, Deacon won the seat of Cunningham at the 1920 state elections for the CPNP. He was Secretary for Public Lands 1929–1932 in the Moore Ministry. He remained the member until his death on Christmas Day in 1943.

References

Members of the Queensland Legislative Assembly
1872 births
1943 deaths